"Uncle John from Jamaica" is a song by Dutch Eurodance group Vengaboys. It was released in May 2000 as the third single from their third album, The Platinum Album (2000), and became a top-10 hit in Austria, the Netherlands, New Zealand and the United Kingdom. It has been certified gold in New Zealand for sales exceeding 5,000 copies.

Track listings
Dutch CD single
 "Uncle John from Jamaica" (Hitradio mix) – 3:09
 "Uncle John from Jamaica" (XXL version) – 5:11

Dutch, Canadian, and Australian maxi-CD single
 "Uncle John from Jamaica" (Hitradio mix) – 3:09
 "Uncle John from Jamaica" (XXL version) – 5:11
 "Uncle John from Jamaica" (karaoke version) – 3:01
 "Uncle John from Jamaica" (M.I.K.E. remix) – 7:21
 "Uncle John from Jamaica" (Lock 'N Load remix) – 6:42
 "Uncle John from Jamaica" (video) – 3:15
 Making of the video – 3:55

UK CD1
 "Uncle John from Jamaica" (Hitradio mix) – 3:09
 "Uncle John from Jamaica" (Lock 'N' Load 'Wake Up Call' remix) – 6:45
 "Uncle John from Jamaica" (karaoke version) – 3:01
 "Uncle John from Jamaica" (video)

UK CD2
 "Uncle John from Jamaica" (XXL version) – 5:11
 "We're Going to Ibiza!" (Beach extended mix) – 5:22
 The making of "Uncle John from Jamaica" (video)

UK cassette single
 "Uncle John from Jamaica" (Hitradio mix) – 3:09
 "Uncle John from Jamaica" (XXL version) – 5:11
 "Uncle John from Jamaica" (Lock 'N' Load 'Wake Up Call' remix) – 6:45

Charts

Weekly charts

Year-end charts

Certifications

Release history

References

Vengaboys songs
2000 singles
2000 songs
Positiva Records singles
Songs about Jamaica
Songs written by Dennis van den Driesschen
Songs written by Wessel van Diepen